Fundy Middle and High School (FMHS) is a middle and high school that services eastern Charlotte County in southern New Brunswick, Canada. Located in the town of St. George, FHS is home to some 500+ students, from grades 6–12. The school is broken into a middle level (6, 7 & 8) and high school (9-12). 

Fundy Middle and High School opened in 1978, replacing the older and smaller schools in St George, Blacks Harbour and Back Bay. It is the only high school in the St. George area, and has recently been designated a "community school", bringing a new era of cooperation between the school and the community it serves.

General information
Fundy High School offers a wide variety of sports and activities to its students, and various sporting and theatrical venues to the public.

The building
Fundy High School was built in 1978. The building has a double gym, a BBT lab, three computer labs, a greenhouse, and a Theatre used for plays, lectures by guest speakers, and district drama festivals. There is also a biology lab, chemistry lab, and physics lab, a media resource center, an automotive/metal shop, electrical shop, and a wood working shop.

See also
 List of schools in New Brunswick
 Anglophone South School District

References

Students at the school

External links
 Official School Website
 New Brunswick School District 17 Website

High schools in New Brunswick
Schools in Charlotte County, New Brunswick